Swope Glacier is a glacier which drains westward from the Ford Ranges, between Mounts Woodward and West, into Sulzberger Ice Shelf. Features in these ranges were discovered and successively mapped by the Byrd Antarctic Expedition (1928–30) and (1933–35) and by the United States Antarctic Service (USAS) (1939–41) all led by R. Admiral Richard E. Byrd. The glacier is named for Gerard Swope, president of General Electric Co., who contributed various types of electrical equipment to the Byrd Antarctic Expedition (1933–35).

References

Glaciers of Marie Byrd Land